Athrypsiastis is a genus of moths of the family Xyloryctidae. The genus was erected by Edward Meyrick in 1910.

Species
 Athrypsiastis candidella (Walker, 1863)
 Athrypsiastis chionodes Diakonoff, 1954
 Athrypsiastis delicata Diakonoff, 1954
 Athrypsiastis phaeoleuca Meyrick, 1910
 Athrypsiastis rosiflora Meyrick, 1930
 Athrypsiastis salva Meyrick, 1932
 Athrypsiastis symmetra Meyrick, 1915

References

 
Xyloryctidae
Xyloryctidae genera